{{Infobox organization
| name            = Academy of Motion Picture Arts and Sciences
| logo            =  Academy of Motion Picture Arts and Sciences logo.svg
| image           = 
| caption         = 
| map             = 
| msize           = 
| mcaption        = 
| abbreviation    = AMPAS
| motto           = 
| formation       = 
| type            = Trade association
| status          = 501(c)(6)
| purpose         = To recognize and uphold excellence in the motion picture arts and sciences, inspire imagination, and connect the world through the medium of motion pictures.
| headquarters    = Beverly Hills, California, U.S.
| region_served   = 
| membership      = 9,921 (2020)
| leader_title    = President
| leader_name     = Janet Yang (since 2022)
| subsidiaries    = Academy Museum Foundation 501(c)(3),  Academy Foundation 501(c)(3),  Archival Foundation 501(c)(3),  Vine Street Archive Foundation 501(c)(3)
| employees       = 255
| employees_year  = 2018
| volunteers      = 632
| volunteers_year = 2018
| revenue         = $147,889,867
| revenue_year    = 2019
| expenses        = $103,813,370
| expenses_year   = 2019
| website         = 
| coordinates     = 
| tax_id          = 95-0473280<ref name= irseos>"Academy Of Motion Picture Arts And Sciences". Tax Exempt Organization Search. Internal Revenue Service. Retrieved March 30, 2022.</ref>
}}
The Academy of Motion Picture Arts and Sciences (AMPAS, often pronounced ; also known as simply the Academy or the Motion Picture Academy) is a professional honorary organization with the stated goal of advancing the arts and sciences of motion pictures. The Academy's corporate management and general policies are overseen by a board of governors, which includes representatives from each of the craft branches.

As of April 2020, the organization was estimated to consist of around 9,921 motion picture professionals. The Academy is an international organization and membership is open to qualified filmmakers around the world.

The Academy is known around the world for its annual Academy Awards, now officially and popularly known as "The Oscars".

In addition, the Academy holds the Governors Awards annually for lifetime achievement in film; presents Scientific and Technical Awards annually; gives Student Academy Awards annually to filmmakers at the undergraduate and graduate level; awards up to five Nicholl Fellowships in Screenwriting annually; and operates the Margaret Herrick Library (at the Fairbanks Center for Motion Picture Study) in Beverly Hills, California, and the Pickford Center for Motion Picture Study in Hollywood, Los Angeles. The Academy opened the Academy Museum of Motion Pictures in Los Angeles in 2021.

History

The notion of the Academy of Motion Picture Arts and Sciences (AMPAS) began with Louis B. Mayer, head of Metro-Goldwyn-Mayer (MGM). He said he wanted to create an organization that would mediate labor disputes without unions and improve the film industry's image. He met with actor Conrad Nagel, director Fred Niblo, and the head of the Association of Motion Picture Producers, Fred Beetson to discuss these matters. The idea of this elite club having an annual banquet was discussed, but no mention of awards at that time. They also established that membership into the organization would only be open to people involved in one of the five branches of the industry: actors, directors, writers, technicians, and producers.

After their brief meeting, Mayer gathered up a group of thirty-six people involved in the film industry and invited them to a formal banquet at the Ambassador Hotel in Los Angeles on January 11, 1927. That evening Mayer presented to those guests what he called the International Academy of Motion Picture Arts and Sciences. Everyone in the room that evening became a founder of the Academy. Between that evening and when the official Articles of Incorporation for the organization were filed on May 4, 1927, the "International" was dropped from the name, becoming the "Academy of Motion Picture Arts and Sciences".

Several organizational meetings were held prior to the first official meeting held on May 6, 1927. Their first organizational meeting was held on May 11 at the Biltmore Hotel. At that meeting Douglas Fairbanks, Sr. was elected as the first president of the Academy, while Fred Niblo was the first vice-president, and their first roster, composed of 230 members, was printed. That night, the Academy also bestowed its first honorary membership, to Thomas Edison. Initially, the Academy was broken down into five main groups, or branches, although this number of branches has grown over the years. The original five were: Producers, Actors, Directors, Writers and Technicians.

The initial concerns of the group had to do with labor." However, as time went on, the organization moved "further away from involvement in labor-management arbitrations and negotiations." One of several committees formed in those initial days was for "Awards of Merit," but it was not until May 1928 that the committee began to have serious discussions about the structure of the awards and the presentation ceremony. By July 1928, the board of directors had approved a list of 12 awards to be presented. During July the voting system for the Awards was established, and the nomination and selection process began. This "award of merit for distinctive achievement" is what we know now as the Academy Awards.

The initial location of the organization was 6912 Hollywood Boulevard. In November 1927, the Academy moved to the Roosevelt Hotel at 7010 Hollywood Boulevard, which was also the month the Academy's library began compiling a complete collection of books and periodicals dealing with the industry from around the world. In May 1928, the Academy authorized the construction of a state of the art screening room, to be located in the Club lounge of the hotel. The screening room was not completed until April 1929.

With the publication of Academy Reports (No. 1): Incandescent Illumination in July 1928, the Academy began a long history of publishing books to assist its members. Research Council of the Academy of Motion Picture Arts and Sciences trained Signal Corps officers, during World War II, who later won two Oscars, for Seeds of Destiny and Toward Independence.

In 1929, Academy members, in a joint venture with the University of Southern California, created America's first film school to further the art and science of moving pictures. The school's founding faculty included Fairbanks (President of the Academy), D. W. Griffith, William C. deMille, Ernst Lubitsch, Irving Thalberg, and Darryl F. Zanuck.

1930 saw another move, to 7046 Hollywood Boulevard, in order to accommodate the enlarging staff, and by December of that year the library was acknowledged as "having one of the most complete collections of information on the motion picture industry anywhere in existence." They remained at that location until 1935 when further growth caused them to move once again. This time, the administrative offices moved to one location, to the Taft Building at the corner of Hollywood and Vine, while the library moved to 1455 North Gordon Street.

In 1934, the Academy began publication of the Screen Achievement Records Bulletin, which today is known as the Motion Picture Credits Database. This is a list of film credits up for an Academy Award, as well as other films released in Los Angeles County, using research materials from the Academy's Margaret Herrick Library. Another publication of the 1930s was the first annual Academy Players Directory in 1937. The Directory was published by the Academy until 2006 when it was sold to a private concern. The Academy had been involved in the technical aspects of film making since its founding in 1927, and by 1938, the Science and Technology Council consisted of 36 technical committees addressing technical issues related to sound recording and reproduction, projection, lighting, film preservation, and cinematography.

In 2009, the inaugural Governors Awards were held, at which the Academy awards the Academy Honorary Award, the Jean Hersholt Humanitarian Award and the Irving G. Thalberg Memorial Award.

In 2016, the Academy became the target of criticism for its failure to recognize the achievements of minority professionals. For the second year in a row, all 20 nominees in the major acting categories were white. The president of the Academy Cheryl Boone Isaacs, the first African American and third woman to lead the Academy, denied in 2015 that there was a problem. When asked if the Academy had difficulty with recognizing diversity, she replied "Not at all. Not at all." When the nominations for acting were all white for a second year in a row Gil Robertson IV, president of the African American Film Critics Association called it "offensive." The actors' branch is "overwhelmingly white" and the question is raised whether conscious or unconscious racial biases played a role.

Spike Lee, interviewed shortly after the all-white nominee list was published, pointed to Hollywood leadership as the root problem, "We may win an Oscar now and then, but an Oscar is not going to fundamentally change how Hollywood does business. I'm not talking about Hollywood stars. I'm talking about executives. We're not in the room." Boone Isaacs also released a statement, in which she said "I am both heartbroken and frustrated about the lack of inclusion. This is a difficult but important conversation, and it's time for big changes." After Boone Isaac's statement, prominent African-Americans such as director Spike Lee, actors Will Smith and Jada Pinkett Smith, and activist Rev. Al Sharpton called for a boycott of the 2016 Oscars for failing to recognize minority achievements, the board voted to make "historic" changes to its membership. The Academy stated that by 2020 it would double its number of women and minority members. While the Academy has addressed a higher profile for African-Americans, it has yet to raise the profile of other people of color artists, in front of and behind the camera.

In 2018, the Academy invited a record 928 new members.

Casting director David Rubin was elected President of the Academy in August, 2019.

In 2020, Parasite became the first non-English language film to win Best Picture. In June 2022, Bill Kramer was named the CEO of the Academy. Also in 2022, Janet Yang was elected as the first Asian American President of the Academy.

Galleries and theaters

The Academy's numerous and diverse operations are housed in three facilities in the Los Angeles area: the headquarters building in Beverly Hills, which was constructed specifically for the Academy, and two Centers for Motion Picture Study – one in Beverly Hills, the other in Hollywood – which were existing structures restored and transformed to contain the Academy's Library, Film Archive and other departments and programs.

Current

Academy Headquarters
The Academy Headquarters Building in Beverly Hills once housed two galleries that were open free to the public. The Grand Lobby Gallery and the Fourth Floor Gallery offered changing exhibits related to films, film-making and film personalities. These galleries have since been closed in preparation for the opening of the Academy Museum of Motion Pictures in 2020.

The building includes the Samuel Goldwyn Theater, which seats 1,012, and was designed to present films at maximum technical accuracy, with state-of-the-art projection equipment and sound system. The theater is busy year-round with the Academy's public programming, members-only screenings, movie premieres and other special activities (including the live television broadcast of the Academy Awards nominations announcement every January). The building once housed the Academy Little Theater, a 67-seat screening facility, but this was converted to additional office space in a building remodel.

Pickford Center for Motion Picture Study

The Pickford Center for Motion Picture Study, located in central Hollywood and named for legendary actress and Academy founder Mary Pickford, houses several Academy departments, including the Academy Film Archive, the Science and Technology Council, Student Academy Awards and Grants, and the Nicholl Fellowships in Screenwriting. The building, originally dedicated on August 18, 1948, is the oldest surviving structure in Hollywood that was designed specifically with television in mind. Additionally, it is the location of the Linwood Dunn Theater, which seats 286 people.

Fairbanks Center for Motion Picture Study

The Fairbanks Center for Motion Picture Study is located at 333 S. La Cienega Boulevard in Beverly Hills. It is home to the Academy's Margaret Herrick Library, a world-renowned, non-circulating reference and research collection devoted to the history and development of the motion picture as an art form and an industry. Established in 1928, the library is open to the public and used year-round by students, scholars, historians and industry professionals. The library is named for Margaret Herrick, the Academy's first librarian who also played a major role in the Academy's first televised broadcast, helping to turn the Oscar ceremony into a major annual televised event.

The building itself was built in 1928, where it was originally built to be a water treatment plant for Beverly Hills. Its "bell tower" held water-purifying hardware.

The Academy Museum of Motion Pictures

The Academy Museum of Motion Pictures, a Los Angeles museum, is the newest facility associated with the Academy.

Former

Academy Theater in New York
The Academy also has a New York City-based East Coast showcase theater, the Academy Theater at Lighthouse International. The 220-seat venue was redesigned in 2011 by renowned theater designer Theo Kalomirakis, including an extensive installation of new audio and visual equipment. The theater is in the East 59th Street headquarters of the non-profit vision loss organization, Lighthouse International. In July 2015, it was announced that the Academy was forced to move out, due to Lighthouse International selling the property the theater was in.

Membership
Membership in the Academy is by invitation only. Invitation comes from the Board of Governors. Membership eligibility may be achieved by earning a competitive Oscar nomination, or by the sponsorship of two current Academy members from the same branch to which the candidate seeks admission.

New membership proposals are considered annually in the spring. Press releases announce the names of those who have recently been invited to join. Membership in the Academy does not expire, even if a member struggles later in his or her career.

Academy membership is divided into 17 branches, representing different disciplines in motion pictures. Members may not belong to more than one branch. Members whose work does not fall within one of the branches may belong to a group known as "Members at Large". Members at Large have all the privileges of branch membership except for representation on the Board. Associate members are those closely allied to the industry but not actively engaged in motion picture production. They are not represented on the Board and do not vote on Academy Awards.

According to a February 2012 study conducted by the Los Angeles Times (sampling over 5,000 of its 5,765 members), the Academy at that time was 94% white, 77% male, 86% age 50 or older, and had a median age of 62. A third of members were previous winners or nominees of Academy Awards themselves. Of the Academy's 54-member Board of Governors, 25 are female.

On June 29, 2016, a paradigm shift began in the Academy's selection process, resulting in a new class comprising 46% women and 41% people of color. The effort to diversify the Academy was led by social activist and Broadway Black managing-editor April Reign. Reign created the Twitter hashtag #OscarsSoWhite as a means of criticizing the dearth of non-white nominees for the 2015 Academy Awards. Though the hashtag drew widespread media attention, the Academy remained obstinate on the matter of adopting a resolution that would make demonstrable its efforts to increase diversity. With the 2016 Academy Awards, many, including April Reign, were dismayed by the Academy's indifference about representation and inclusion, as the 2016 nominees were once again entirely white. April Reign revived #OscarsSoWhite, and renewed her campaign efforts, which included multiple media appearances and interviews with reputable news outlets. As a result of Reign's campaign, the discourse surrounding representation and recognition in film spread beyond the United States and became a global discussion . Faced with mounting pressure to expand the Academy membership, the Academy capitulated and instituted new policies to ensure that future Academy membership invitations would better represent the demographics of modern film-going audiences. The A2020 initiative was announced in January 2016 to double the number of women and people of color in membership by 2020.

Members are able to see many new films for free at the Samuel Goldwyn Theater  within two weeks of their debut, and sometimes before release; in addition, some of the screeners are available through iTunes to its members.

Lists of invitees
List of invitees for AMPAS Membership (2004)
List of invitees for AMPAS Membership (2005)
List of invitees for AMPAS Membership (2006)
List of invitees for AMPAS Membership (2007)
List of invitees for AMPAS Membership (2008)
List of invitees for AMPAS Membership (2009)
List of invitees for AMPAS Membership (2010)
List of invitees for AMPAS Membership (2011)

Expulsions
Five people are known to have been expelled from the Academy. Academy officials acknowledge that other members have been expelled in the past, most for selling their Oscar tickets, but no numbers are available.
 Actor Carmine Caridi was expelled on February 3, 2004, for copyright infringement. He was accused of leaking screeners that had been sent to him.
 Producer Harvey Weinstein was expelled for "sexually predatory behavior and workplace harassment" after an emergency meeting held on October 13, 2017.
 Actor Bill Cosby and director Roman Polanski were expelled "in accordance with the organization's Standards of Conduct" on May 1, 2018. Cosby had been convicted of sexual assault one week earlier, while Polanski had been convicted in 1977 of unlawful sexual intercourse with a minor.
 Cinematographer Adam Kimmel was expelled in 2021 after a Variety story exposed the fact that he is a registered sex offender.

Resignations
The following members have voluntarily resigned from the organization:

 Sound engineer Tom Fleischman resigned from the Academy on March 5, 2022, citing changes to the broadcast of the 94th Academy Awards ceremony, during which eight award categories  including Best Sound  were not presented live, but rather during the commercial breaks. Production sound mixer Peter Kurland also resigned his membership on March 23, 2022, citing the changes.
 Actor Will Smith announced his resignation from the Academy on April 1, 2022, five days after his onstage slap of Chris Rock, one of the ceremony's presenters, during the 94th Academy Awards.

Academy branches
The 17 branches of the Academy are:
 Actors
 Casting Directors (created July 31, 2013)
 Cinematographers
 Costume Designers (created from former Art Directors Branch)
 Designers (created from former Art Directors Branch)
 Directors
 Documentary
 Executives
 Film Editors
 Make-up Artists and Hairstylists
 Music
 Producers
 Public Relations
 Short Films and Feature Animation
 Sound
 Visual Effects
 Writers

Board of Governors
, the Board of Governors consists of 54 governors: three governors from each of the 17 Academy branches and three governors-at-large. The Makeup Artists and Hairstylists Branch, created in 2006, had only one governor until July 2013. The Casting Directors Branch, created in 2013, elected its first three governors in Fall 2013.
The Board of Governors is responsible for corporate management, control, and general policies. The Board of Governors also appoints a CEO and a COO to supervise the administrative activities of the Academy.

Original 36 founders of the Academy

From the original formal banquet, which was hosted by Louis B. Mayer in 1927, everyone invited became a founder of the Academy:

Actors
 Richard Barthelmess
 Jack Holt
 Conrad Nagel
 Milton Sills
 Douglas Fairbanks
 Harold Lloyd
 Mary Pickford

Directors
 Cecil B. DeMille
 Frank Lloyd
 Henry King
 Fred Niblo
 John M. Stahl
 Raoul Walsh

Lawyers
 Edwin Loeb
 George W. Cohen

Producers
 Fred Beetson
 Charles H. Christie
 Sid Grauman
 Milton E. Hoffman
 Jesse L. Lasky
 M. C. Levee
 Louis B. Mayer
 Joseph M. Schenck
 Irving Thalberg
 Harry Warner
 Jack L. Warner
 Harry Rapf

Technicians
 J. Arthur Ball
 Cedric Gibbons
 Roy Pomeroy

Writers
 Joseph W. Farnham
 Benjamin Glazer
 Jeanie MacPherson
 Bess Meredyth
 Carey Wilson
 Frank E. Woods

Presidents of the Academy
Presidents are elected for one-year terms and may not be elected for more than four consecutive terms.

Source: 

Current administration of the Academy
Academy Officers
 President – Janet Yang
 Vice President – Teri E. Dorman
 Vice President / Secretary – Donna Gigliotti
 Vice President – Lynette Howell Taylor
 Vice President – Larry Karaszewski
 Vice President / Treasurer – David Linde
 Vice President – Isis Mussenden
 Vice President – Kim Taylor-Coleman
 Vice President – Wynn P. Thomas
 Chief Executive Officer – Bill Kramer

Governors
 Actors Branch – Whoopi Goldberg, Marlee Matlin, Rita Wilson
 Casting Directors Branch – Richard Hicks, Kim Taylor-Coleman, Debra Zane
 Cinematographers Branch – Dion Beebe, Paul Cameron, Mandy Walker
 Costume Designers Branch – Ruth E. Carter, Eduardo Castro, Isis Mussenden
 Directors Branch – Susanne Bier, Ava DuVernay, Jason Reitman
 Documentary Branch – Kate Amend, Chris Hegedus, Jean Tsien
 Executives Branch – Pam Abdy, Donna Gigliotti, David Linde
 Film Editors Branch – Nancy Richardson, Stephen E. Rivkin, Terilyn A. Shropshire
 Makeup Artists and Hairstylists Branch – Howard Berger, Bill Corso, Linda Flowers
 Marketing and Public Relations Branch – Megan Colligan, Laura Kim, Christina Kounelias
 Music Branch – Lesley Barber, Charles Bernstein, Charles Fox
 Producers Branch – Jason Blum, Lynette Howell Taylor, Jennifer Todd
 Production Design Branch – Tom Duffield, Missy Parker, Wynn P. Thomas
 Short Films and Feature Animation Branch – Bonnie Arnold, Jon Bloom, Marlon West
 Sound Branch – Gary C. Bourgeois, Peter J. Devlin, Teri E. Dorman
 Visual Effects Branch – Rob Bredow, Brooke Breton, Paul Debevec
 Writers Branch – Larry Karaszewski, Howard A. Rodman, Eric Roth
 Governors-at-large (nominated by the President and elected by the board) – DeVon Franklin, Rodrigo García, Janet Yang

See also

 Academy of Television Arts & Sciences
 American Academy of Arts and Sciences
 American Film Institute
 British Academy of Film and Television Arts
 Académie des Arts et Techniques du Cinéma
 Motion Picture Association of America
 National Film Registry

References

External links

 
 
 
 Hollywood is a Union Town, The Nation'' (April 2, 1938) History of the Academy and Screen Actors Guild

 
 
Cinema of Southern California
Culture of Los Angeles
Film-related professional associations
Media museums in California
Beverly Hills, California
Organizations established in 1927
1927 establishments in California